Walker Ross Kessler (born July 26, 2001) is an American professional basketball player for the Utah Jazz of the National Basketball Association (NBA). He played college basketball for the North Carolina Tar Heels and Auburn Tigers.

High school career
Kessler played basketball for Woodward Academy in College Park, Georgia. In his senior season, he averaged 17.8 points, 9.3 rebounds and 5.2 blocks per game, leading his team to its first Class 4A state title. Kessler was named The Atlanta Journal-Constitution Player of the Year, Mr. Georgia Basketball and Georgia Gatorade Player of the Year. He was a McDonald's All-American selection. Kessler competed for Game Elite on the Amateur Athletic Union circuit.

Recruiting
A consensus five-star recruit and one of the top centers in the 2020 class, he committed to playing college basketball for North Carolina over offers from Duke, Michigan, Virginia and Vanderbilt, among others.

College career

North Carolina (2020–2021) 
On March 10, 2021, Kessler posted 16 points, 12 rebounds and eight blocks in a 101–59 win over Notre Dame in the second round of the ACC tournament. He set a North Carolina freshman record and an ACC Tournament record for blocks in a game. As a freshman, he averaged 4.4 points and 3.2 rebounds per game.

Auburn (2021–2022) 
Following the season, Kessler transferred to Auburn, choosing the Tigers over Gonzaga. On December 29, 2021, he posted a triple-double of 16 points, a career-high 11 blocks and 10 rebounds against LSU. On January 25, Kessler received SEC Player of the Week honors following strong performances against Georgia and Kentucky. Kessler was regarded one of the nations premier shot blockers, setting the Auburn single season block record, leading the nation in blocks and recording more blocks than all but 13 teams. At the conclusion of the regular season, Kessler was named the SEC Defensive Player of the Year, a member of the All-SEC First Team and a 3rd Team All American. On April 3, 2022, Kessler declared for the 2022 NBA draft, forgoing his remaining college eligibility.

Professional career

Utah Jazz (2022–present) 
Kessler was selected by the Memphis Grizzlies with the 22nd overall pick before being traded to the Minnesota Timberwolves, alongside TyTy Washington, for Jake LaRavia. On July 6, 2022, two weeks after being drafted, Kessler was traded along with Patrick Beverley, Jarred Vanderbilt, Leandro Bolmaro, Malik Beasley, four future first round picks, and a pick swap to the Utah Jazz in exchange for Rudy Gobert. On July 9, Kessler signed his rookie scale contract with the Jazz.

On January 16, 2023, Kessler put up a double-double with a career-high 20 points and a career-high 21 rebounds, alongside four assists and two blocks in a 126–125 win over the Minnesota Timberwolves.

Career statistics

College

|-
| style="text-align:left;"| 2020–21
| style="text-align:left;"| North Carolina
| 29 || 0 || 8.8 || .578 || .250 || .537 || 3.2 || .3 || .5 || .9 || 4.4
|-
| style="text-align:left;"| 2021–22
| style="text-align:left;"| Auburn
| 34 || 34 || 25.6 || .608 || .200 || .596 || 8.1 || .9 || 1.1 || 4.6 || 11.4
|- class="sortbottom"
| style="text-align:center;" colspan="2"| Career
| 63 || 34 || 17.9 || .601 || .204 || .577 || 5.8 || .6 || .8 || 2.9 || 8.2

Personal life
Kessler's father, Chad, and his uncle, Alec, played college basketball at Georgia and were drafted into the NBA before becoming orthopedic surgeons. His brother, Houston, also played basketball at Georgia.

References

External links

Auburn Tigers bio
North Carolina Tar Heels bio
USA Basketball bio

2001 births
Living people
All-American college men's basketball players
American men's basketball players
Auburn Tigers men's basketball players
Basketball players from Atlanta
Centers (basketball)
McDonald's High School All-Americans
Memphis Grizzlies draft picks
North Carolina Tar Heels men's basketball players
Power forwards (basketball)
Utah Jazz players
Woodward Academy alumni